Leptoconchus peronii is a species of sea snail, a marine gastropod mollusk, in the family Muricidae, the murex snails or rock snails.

References

 Massin C. (1982). Contribution to the knowledge of two boring gastropods with an annotated list of the genera Magilus Montfort, 1810 and Leptoconchus Rüppell, 1835. Bulletin de l'Institut Royal des Sciences Naturelles de Belgique. 53: 1-28.

External links
  Lamarck [J.-B. M. de. (1818). Histoire naturelle des animaux sans vertèbres. Tome 5. Paris: Deterville/Verdière, 612 pp.]
 Rüppell E. (1835 ["1834"). Description of a new genus of pectinibranchiated gasteropodous Mollusca (Leptoconchus). Proceedings of the Zoological Society of London. 2: 105-106.]
 Lischke C.E. (1871). Diagnosen neuer Meeres-Conchylien von Japan. Malakozoologische Blätter. 18: 39-45.
 Massin C. (1990) Biologie et écologie de Leptoconchus peronii (Lamarck, 1818) (Gastropoda, Coralliophilidae) récolté en Papouasie Nouvelle-Guinée, avec une redescription de l'espèce. Bull. K. Belg. Inst. Nat. Wet. 60: 23-33

peronii
Gastropods described in 1818